Sir Walter Raine (1874–1938) was Conservative MP for Sunderland, at the time a two-seat constituency.

The managing director of his father's coal exporting firm, Raine was a prominent Methodist and held many church offices as well as civic posts in Sunderland. He was Mayor of Sunderland from 1920 to 1922.

He won the seat in 1922, held it in 1923 and 1924, but lost to Labour in 1929. He was knighted in 1927.

A ferry named after him later operated across the River Wear in Sunderland.

Sources

Conservative Party (UK) MPs for English constituencies
Politics of the City of Sunderland
1874 births
1938 deaths
Knights Bachelor
20th-century British businesspeople
British Methodists